Jankovec is a village located in Resen Municipality in the Republic of North Macedonia. The people of Jankovec are mostly farmers and own their own farms or plantations. Apple, corn, wheat and tobacco are generally grown in the region.

With a population of 1,169, Jankovec is the second-largest settlement in the municipality after Resen.

Churches
There are 5 churches in Jankovec, two of which are situated within Jankovec Monastery. 
St. Athanasius Church, the oldest church
St. Ignatius of Antioch Church, relatively new church, second monastery church
St. John Church, located in the village and was consecrated in 1866
St. Nicholas Church, located about 1 km east of the village
Church of Dormition of the Theotokos, the main monastery church consecrated in the 18th century

Demographics
Aside from the municipal centre of Resen, Jankovec is the only settlement in Resen Municipality to currently have over 1,000 residents. A small part of the village population is of Aromanian origin.

Aromanians were the second biggest ethnic group in the village after Macedonians during Ottoman times.

References

Villages in Resen Municipality
Aromanian settlements in North Macedonia